Delusions of Grandeur is the thirteenth studio album by American rapper Gucci Mane. It was released on June 21, 2019, by Atlantic Records and 1017 Records. The album features guest appearances from Meek Mill, Gunna, Lil Baby, Justin Bieber, Jeremih, A Boogie wit da Hoodie, Wiz Khalifa, Rick Ross, Lil Uzi Vert, Young Dolph, Anuel AA, and Peewee Longway, among others.

The album is supported by three singles: "Love Thru the Computer" featuring Justin Bieber, "Backwards" featuring Meek Mill and "Proud of You". Delusions of Grandeur debuted at number seven on the US Billboard 200 selling 32,000 equivalent copies (3,000 in pure album sales).

Background
During an appearance on Beats 1 on June 13, 2019, Gucci Mane announced the title of his studio album. In addition, he anticipated the album by stating: "it's going to surprise a lot of people, man, because [it's] a crazy album."

Promotion
The album's lead single, "Love Thru the Computer" featuring Justin Bieber was released on May 31, 2019.

The second single "Backwards" featuring Meek Mill premiered on Beats 1 on June 13, 2019. Its music video premiered on June 17, 2019.

Followed by the third single, "Proud of You" on June 18, 2019, alongside its music video that was directed by DreVinci WRKS released on the day after.

Track listing

Notes
  signifies an uncredited co-producer
 "Ice" is stylized as "ICE"
 "Us" is stylized as "US"

Sample credits
 "Love Thru the Computer" contains a sample from "Computer Love", written by Roger Troutman, Larry Troutman, and Shirley Murdock, as performed by Zapp & Roger.

Personnel
 Amani Hernández – mixing , engineering assistant 
 Josh Gudwin – mixing 
 DJ Riggins – mixing 
 Jacob Richards – mixing 
 Jaycen Joshua – mixing 
 Mike Seaberg – mixing 
 Max Deak – mixing 
 Colin Leonard – mastering 
 Eddie "eMIX" Hernandez – engineering , mixing 
 Anthony Cruz – engineering 
 Salvador Majail – engineering 
 Sean Paine – engineering

Charts

References

2019 albums
Gucci Mane albums
Atlantic Records albums
Albums produced by Cubeatz
Albums produced by Murda Beatz
Albums produced by Southside (record producer)
Albums produced by Tay Keith
Albums produced by Zaytoven
Albums produced by Hitmaka